José Antonio Redondo García (born 8 March 1953) is a  retired footballer who played as a defender, and a current manager.

Club career
Born in Turón, Mieres, Asturias, Redondo graduated from CD Turón's youth setup, making his senior debuts in the 1971–72 campaign. In the 1972 summer he moved to Sporting de Gijón, being immediately loaned to CD Ensidesa in a six-month deal.

Redondo returned to the Asturian side in 1973 and made his La Liga debut on 7 January, starting in a 0–1 away loss against Real Oviedo. He appeared in 14 matches during the season, with his side narrowly avoided relegation.

After appearing rarely in 1973–74, Redondo featured regularly in the following campaigns, retiring in 1985, aged 31. He was also the club's captain for seven seasons.

Manager career
Redondo began his managerial career at lowly UD Gijón Industrial in 1988, after managing Sporting's youth setup. In 1989, he was appointed the latter's reserve team manager, and remained in charge for one season. He eventually returned to the Rojiblancos in 1997, being appointed assistant manager.

In April 1998, Redondo was appointed caretaker manager, replacing José Manuel Díaz Novoa, as his side were already relegated. He returned to the B-team for the 1998–99 campaign, but was again promoted in October, after Antonio López's resignation.

Redondo returned to the bench only in 2002, at the helm of lowly CD San Martín. He resumed his managerial career in the lower leagues, managing Berrón CF, UC Ceares, Valdesoto CF, L'Entregu CF and UP Langreo; he resigned from the latter on 11 March 2015.

References

External links
 
 
 

1953 births
Living people
Spanish footballers
Association football defenders
La Liga players
Segunda División players
Tercera División players
Sporting de Gijón players
Spanish football managers
Sporting de Gijón managers
CD Ensidesa players
UP Langreo managers
Footballers from Mieres, Asturias